Geoffrey Edwin Kondogbia (born 15 February 1993) is a professional footballer who plays as a defensive midfielder for La Liga club Atlético Madrid. Born in France, he represents the Central African Republic national team. He can also play as a central defender or left-back.

Kondogbia started his career at Lens, then signed with Sevilla at the age of 19. In 2013 he was bought by Monaco for €20 million, and then by Inter Milan for €31 million two years later. He returned to Spain in 2017 to play for Valencia, and in 2020 moved to Atlético Madrid.

Kondogbia earned 57 caps for France across its youth levels, before making his debut for the senior team in 2013. In August 2018, he was cap-tied to the Central African Republic by switching his allegiance, and made his debut for its national team in an official match shortly after.

Club career

Lens
Kondogbia was born in Nemours, Seine-et-Marne of Central African descent, joining Lens' youth system at the age of 11. On 11 April 2010 he signed his first professional contract, agreeing to a four-year deal. He made his debut in Ligue 1 on 21 November, appearing as a late substitute against Olympique Lyonnais.

Kondogbia spent the 2011–12 season in Ligue 2 after the Sang et Ors relegation. He scored his only official goal for the team on 13 April 2012, netting the opener in a 3–0 success at Tours FC.

Sevilla
On 24 July 2012, Kondogbia signed with Spanish club Sevilla FC for an undisclosed fee, believed to be in the region of €3 million. He first appeared in La Liga on 15 September, replacing goalscorer Piotr Trochowski in the 82nd minute of the 1–0 defeat of reigning champions Real Madrid, at the Ramón Sánchez Pizjuán Stadium. He scored his first goal for the Andalusians on 28 January 2013, heading home the first for his team in an eventual 3–0 home derby win against Granada CF.

In Sevilla's semi-final second leg tie of the Copa del Rey against eventual winners Atlético Madrid, on 27 February 2013, Kondogbia picked up a red card as his team ended the match with nine men in the 2–2 home draw, and fell to a 3–4 aggregate loss.

Monaco
Kondogbia returned to the French top division on 31 August 2013, signing a five-year contract with newly promoted AS Monaco FC worth a reported €20 million. He contributed with 26 games and one goal in his first season, helping the club finish second and return to the UEFA Champions League after one decade.

In the Champions League round-of-16's first leg, on 25 February 2015, Kondogbia put his team ahead at Arsenal in an eventual 3–1 win.

Inter Milan
On 22 June 2015, Inter Milan announced that they had signed Kondogbia on a five-year deal for an initial fee of €31 million, subject to a medical, beating a reported €40m bid from city rival A.C. Milan. He scored his first goal for his new team on 8 November, the only away against Torino FC. On 14 February of the following year, he was sent off at the conclusion of a bad-tempered 1–2 loss at ACF Fiorentina for sarcastically applauding the referee; he received a two-match ban.

In June 2016, the Serie A club announced the total cost of Kondogbia was €40.501 million.

Valencia
On 21 August 2017, Valencia CF announced that they reached an agreement with Internazionale for the loan of Kondogbia until 30 June 2018, with an option to make the deal permanent. The deal was part of a loan exchange, with João Cancelo moving in the other direction. He scored on his debut six days later, playing the full 90 minutes and helping to a 2–2 away draw against Real Madrid.

On 24 May 2018, Valencia redeemed the buyout clause of Kondogbia and the player signed a four-year contract.

Atlético Madrid
On 3 November 2020, Kondogbia joined Atlético Madrid on a four-year contract. The club was granted an exception to sign him outside of the transfer window after Arsenal had met the release clause of Thomas Partey on deadline day.

International career
France

Kondogbia was selected to the French squad for the 2013 FIFA U-20 World Cup. In the nation's first group match against Ghana, on 21 June, he scored the opening goal in an eventual 3–1 victory, being chosen by some publications as man of the match for his all-around performance. He netted for the second time in the tournament against hosts Turkey in the round-of-16, leading to a 4–1 victory.

Kondogbia made his debut for the senior team on 14 August 2013 at the age of 20, playing 63 minutes in a 0–0 friendly draw away to Belgium.

Central African Republic
As all five matches he played for France at senior level were not in competitive matches, Kondogbia was never cap-tied and was thus still eligible to represent the Central African Republic, for which he qualified through his parents. He received an official call on 31 August 2018 and made his debut on 12 October, starting and acting as captain in a 4–0 away loss to Ivory Coast in a 2019 Africa Cup of Nations qualifier. On 18 November in the same competition, he scored an added-time equaliser in a 2–2 draw away to Rwanda.

Personal life
Kondogbia's older brother, Evans, was also a footballer. He spent most of his career in Belgium, and represented the Central African Republic internationally.

Kondogbia is of Central African Republic origin.

Career statistics
Club

International

Scores and results list Central African Republic goal tally first, score column indicates score after each Kondogbia goal.

HonoursValenciaCopa del Rey: 2018–19Atletico MadridLa Liga: 2020–21France U20'
FIFA U-20 World Cup: 2013

References

External links

 Profile at the Atlético Madrid website
 
 
 
 
 
 
 

1993 births
Living people
People from Nemours
French sportspeople of Central African Republic descent
Citizens of the Central African Republic through descent
Footballers from Seine-et-Marne
Black French sportspeople
French footballers
Central African Republic footballers
Association football midfielders
Association football utility players
Ligue 1 players
Ligue 2 players
RC Lens players
AS Monaco FC players
La Liga players
Sevilla FC players
Valencia CF players
Atlético Madrid footballers
Serie A players
Inter Milan players
France youth international footballers
France under-21 international footballers
France international footballers
Central African Republic international footballers
Dual internationalists (football)
French expatriate footballers
Central African Republic expatriate footballers
Expatriate footballers in Spain
Expatriate footballers in Italy
French expatriate sportspeople in Spain
French expatriate sportspeople in Italy
Central African Republic expatriate sportspeople in Spain
Central African Republic expatriate sportspeople in Italy